Zirgan (Yergän) is a rural locality (a selo) and the administrative centre of Zirgansky Selsoviet, Meleuzovsky District, Bashkortostan, Russia. The population was 4,125 as of 2010. There are 35 streets.

Geography 
Zirgan is located 33 km north of Meleuz (the district's administrative centre) by road. Sabashevo is the nearest rural locality.

References 

Rural localities in Meleuzovsky District